Orumba North is a Local Government Area in Anambra State, East-central Nigeria.

Towns

The 16 major towns that make up the local government are as follows;
Awa,
Awgbu, 
Omogho, 
Ndiokpalaeze, 
Ndiokolo, 
Amaetiti, 
Ndiokpalaeke, 
Okoh, 
Nanka, 
Ndiukwuenu

Ndikelionwu, 
Ajalli, 
Ufuma, 
Amaokpala, 
Ndiowu, and
Okpeze.

 
It is a region with markedly fertile land for agriculture with prominent products around rice, yam, cassava, and palm oil. Most of the population are subsistence farmers and traders. There is also a large student community as a result of the presence of a Federal Polytechnic located at Okoh.

Schools
Here is the list of secondary schools in Orumba North Local Government Area:
 Community High School, Nanka
 Community Secondary School, Nanka
 Community Secondary School, Oko
 Community Secondary School, Ndikelionwu
 Community Secondary School, Ndiowu
 Community Secondary School, Ufuma
 Community Secondary School, Enugwuabor Ufuma
 Community Secondary School, Awgbu
 Community High School, Awgbu
 Awgbu Grammar School, Awgbu
 Community Secondary School, Ajali
 Community Secondary School, Omogbo
 Community Secondary School, Awa

Notable people
Notable people from Orumba Local Government Area include:

Professor Vincent Chukwuemeka Ike, educationist and author who hails from Ndikelionwu where he is now a traditional King. 
Professor Humphrey Nwosu, from Ajali town, Chairman of the National Electoral Commission of Nigeria (NECON) 
Dr. Alex Ekwueme,  former Vice-president of Nigeria.

Ufuma is particularly popular in the South Eastern part of Nigeria because it had offered sanctuary to fleeing Biafran warlords during the final days of the Nigerian-Biafran conflict.

References
LOCAL GOVERNMENT AREAS IN ANAMBRA STATE dated July 21, 2007; accessed October 4, 2007 

Local Government Areas in Anambra State
Local Government Areas in Igboland